SønderjyskE is a Danish football team. The club plays in the top tier of Danish football, the Danish Superliga. Their home is Haderslev Fodboldstadion in Haderslev. During the 2014-15 campaign they will be competing in the following competitions: Superliga, Danish Cup.

Competitions

Superliga

External links
 Official site
 Official supporters site: SønderjyskE Fodbold Support

2014
Danish football clubs 2014–15 season